A merchandiser is an arcade gaming device, which features a machine that contains a display of merchandise, which can be won by playing the game.
In the trade, such games are described as "skill with prize" (SWP) games, and are a hybrid of games of skill and games of chance, with the preponderance of skill or chance differing between devices and often able to be set by the operator.

Description 

Claw cranes are the most common example of a merchandiser. The player guides a claw in an attempt to pick up a prize and drop it into a hole. Other types of merchandisers can offer prizes ranging from cheap and inexpensive to high end merchandise such as handheld game consoles and mobile phones.

A similar class of games are redemption games, where tickets are won and can be redeemed for merchandise prizes, rather than merchandise being won directly. These are both modern forms of carnival games.

Some games can be configured as either redemption games or merchandisers, such as Flamin' Finger.

Examples 
Examples include:
 Claw crane
 Stacker
 Flamin' Finger, which can be configured as a redemption game or merchandiser
 Money booth

Regulation 

As skill with prize machines, merchandisers are in a legal grey area, due to containing elements of skill and of chance, particularly since payout percentages can to a large extent be set by the operator – such setting leads to machines being described as rigged. They are generally regulated separately from games of pure chance such as slot machines; see Claw vending machine § Legality for statutes pertaining to claw machines.

Claims of being largely or entirely skill-based can expose the operator to accusations of unfair practices; thus some lawyers advise operators to not advertise the machines as being skill-based.

References

External links 
 Bandai Namco Group – Brent Sales – Prize Products

 
Vending